South Tetagouche is an unincorporated community in Gloucester County, New Brunswick, Canada.  The community is west of Bathurst.

History

Notable people

See also
List of communities in New Brunswick

References

Communities in Gloucester County, New Brunswick
Settlements in New Brunswick